Lavernia can refer to:

 La Vernia, Texas
 La Verna, a mountain in Tuscany, called Lavernia by Thomas Babington Macaulay

See also
 Alvernia (disambiguation)